Neoplagiaulacidae is a family of mammal within the extinct order Multituberculata. Fossil remains are known from the Upper Cretaceous through to the latest Eocene/early Oligocene. Representatives have been found in North America, Europe and Asia. They are the last multituberculates known.

Neoplagiaulacinae (Ameghino 1890) has been seen as a sub-family within Ptilodontidae (Cope, 1887). More recent thinking has it as a family. Synonyms are Ectypodidae (Sloan & Van Valen 1965) and Ectypodontidae (Sloan & Van Valen 1965). Most fossils are restricted to teeth. The family is part of the suborder of Cimolodonta within the superfamily of Ptilodontoidea.

Notes

References 
 
 

Ptilodontoids
Cretaceous mammals
Paleocene mammals
Eocene mammals
Eocene extinctions
Late Cretaceous first appearances
Oligocene mammals
Rupelian extinctions
Prehistoric mammal families